Batrachyla is a genus of frogs in the family Batrachylidae. Sometimes known as the South American wood frogs, these frogs are distributed in southern South America (Argentina and Chile).

Species
There are five species in the genus:
 Batrachyla antartandica Barrio, 1967
 Batrachyla fitzroya Basso, 1994
 Batrachyla leptopus Bell, 1843
 Batrachyla nibaldoi Formas, 1997
 Batrachyla taeniata (Girard, 1855)

References

 
Batrachylidae
Amphibians of South America